Saksi Kunci (English: Key of Witness) is a criminal news program that aired on Kompas TV in Indonesia. This criminal news program was launched on June 22, 2020. and broadcasts criminal news that happens every day.

See also 

 Buser
 Patroli

References 

Indonesian television news shows
Indonesian-language television shows
2020 Indonesian television series debuts
2020s Indonesian television series
Kompas TV original programming